The Erie Railroad Piermont Branch was a rail branch line that was formed from the easternmost portion of the original main line of the Erie. It ran from Suffern, New York to Piermont, New York.

Route 
The line began at the Piermont Pier, where steamboats ran to New York City. It then ran to Sparkill, where it connected with the Northern Branch. After this, it ran northwest to Nanuet, where. it connected with what is now the NJ Transit Pascack Valley Line. It then ran through Monsey and Tallman, and turned north in Suffern.

Remnants

The rail line is an active Norfolk Southern line between Suffern and Tallman. Train H55, based out of Hillburn Yard, runs down the line. Overgrown tracks remain between Tallman and Spring Valley station. The Pascack Valley Line follows the route of the Piermont Branch from Spring Valley to Nanuet. Between Nanuet and Blauvelt, there are very few remnants. The only remnants in this section are a surviving Milepost 8 marker, and a bridge over a creek that carries nothing. Past Blauvelt, the line has been converted to rail trails:  the Joseph B. Clarke Rail Trail from Blauvelt to Sparkill;  the Old Erie Path from Sparkill to South Nyack and the Raymond G. Esposito Trail from South Nyack to Nyack. The line terminated at Franklin Street in Nyack.

References 

Erie Railroad lines
Rail lines in Rockland County, New York